Marc Angel (born 1963) is a Luxembourgish politician of the Luxembourg Socialist Workers' Party (LSAP) who has been serving as Vice-President of the European Parliament since 18 January 2023, and a Member of the European Parliament since 10 December 2019. In the European Parliament he is known for being a 'Champion of Equality'.

Education 
Angel attended the University of Vienna between 1984-1988 and earned a degree (Mag. Phil.) as a translator for German, French and English. Thereafter he continued his tourism economy studies at the Vienna University of Economics and Business between 1988 and 1990.

Work experience 
Between 1990 and 2004 Angel taught in Luxembourg hotel and tourism management school.

Political career 
Angel started his political career in the Luxembourg City Council as its Member between 1994 and 2020. He became Member of the Luxembourgish Parliament at 2004 and as of 2013 he was acting as Chairman of the Committee for Foreign and European Affairs, International Development,
Immigration and Asylum. He was also member of
 the Committee on Gender Issues,
 the Health Committee,
 the Economic Affairs Committee,
 the Institutional Affairs Committee.
As a Member of the Luxembourgish Parliament, he also became
 Treasurer of the NATO Parliamentary Assembly,
 President of the Luxembourg Delegation to COSAC,
 President of the Luxembourg Delegation to Benelux Parliament.
He resigned from the Parliament in December 2019 after becoming a Member of the European Parliament.

Political activity in the European Parliament 
Angel became Member of the European Parliament on the 10th of December 2019. Beside acting as Head of the Luxembourgish Delegation in the S&D group, has served on the Committee on Employment and Social Affairs (since 2019) and the Committee on Petitions (since 2020). He is a substitute member of the Committee on the Internal Market and Consumer Protection and the Committee on Economic and Monetary Affairs.

In addition to his committee assignments, Angel is part of the parliament's delegation to the EU-Chile Joint Parliamentary Committee, to the Euro-Latin American Parliamentary Assembly and for relations with China. He also co-chairs the European Parliament Intergroup on LGBT Rights.

Since 2021, Angel has been part of the parliament's delegation to the Conference on the Future of Europe.

In 2023 he was elected Vice-President of the European Parliament, replacing Eva Kaili.

Other activities 
 In 1990, Angel co-founded STOP AIDS NOW a.s.b.l in Luxembourg.
 In 2008, Angel was appointed as Honorary Consul of the Republic of Cap Verde in Luxembourg.
 As of 2010, Angel is the Honorary President of the LCTO - Luxembourg City Tourist Office.
 As of 2015, he is a UNAIDS Champion for the 90-90-90 Treatment Target.

References

Living people
MEPs for Luxembourg 2019–2024
Luxembourg Socialist Workers' Party MEPs
Luxembourg Socialist Workers' Party politicians
1963 births